Nowkar-e Mokhi (also Romanized as Nowkār-e Mokhī and Nowkār Mokhī; also known as Naukāl Mukhi, Nowkāl-e Mokhī, Nowkār-e Nakhlī, and Shīf Nowkāl-e Nakhlī) is a village in Angali Rural District, in the Central District of Bushehr County, Bushehr Province, Iran. At the 2006 census, its population was 164, in 33 families.

References 

Populated places in Bushehr County